DEVO Live 1980 is a live album and video DualDisc release by American new wave band Devo, released by Target Video in 2005.

Background
The release documents a performance by the band filmed on August 17, 1980, during their Freedom of Choice tour, when the band was gaining mainstream success on the strength of the Freedom of Choice album and their hit single, "Whip It". It was shot by director/cameraman Joe Reis and his Target Video team at the Phoenix Theater in Petaluma, California, using three video cameras. Bassist/songwriter/vocalist Gerald V. Casale provided the following note for the DualDisc's back cover: "This lone artifact offers indisputable evidence that in 1980 Devo had reached a turning point. We were no longer just art monsters, we were mainstream performers too."

The setlist is similar to that of the full DEV-O Live album (as released by Rhino Records' Rhino Handmade imprint in 1999 and as a regular Rhino CD release in 2005), which was recorded within a few days of this concert. The DVD side of the DualDisc features bonus video footage of Devo opening for themselves at the M-80 Festival as "Dove, the Band of Love".

A short clip of the band performing "Gut Feeling/(Slap Your Mammy)" from this concert was previously seen on the band's 2004 DVD release Live in the Land of the Rising Sun.

Release
Devo Live 1980 was first released on July 12, 2005. The DualDisc release is available in both jewel case (CD) and Amaray (DVD) packaging. Separate CD and DVD editions were also issued.

Track listing

DVD side
"Freedom of Choice Theme Song"
"Whip It"
"Snowball"
"It's Not Right"
"Girl U Want"
"Planet Earth"
"S.I.B. (Swelling Itching Brain)"
"Secret Agent Man"
"Pink Pussycat"
"Blockhead"
"(I Can't Get No) Satisfaction"
"Uncontrollable Urge"
"Mongoloid"
"Be Stiff"
"Gates of Steel"
"Freedom of Choice"
"Jocko Homo"
"Smart Patrol/Mr. DNA"
"Gut Feeling/Slap Your Mammy"
"Come Back Jonee"
"Tunnel of Life"
"Devo Corporate Anthem"

CD side
"Whip It"
"Snowball"
"It's Not Right"
"Girl U Want"
"Planet Earth"
"S.I.B. (Swelling Itching Brain)"
"Secret Agent Man"
"Pink Pussycat"
"Blockhead"
"(I Can't Get No) Satisfaction"
"Uncontrollable Urge"
"Mongoloid"
"Be Stiff"
"Gates of Steel"
"Freedom of Choice"
"Smart Patrol/Mr. DNA"
"Gut Feeling/Slap Your Mammy"
"Come Back Jonee"

Personnel
Devo
Mark Mothersbaugh – vocals, keyboards, guitar
Gerald V. Casale – vocals, bass, bass keyboards
Bob Mothersbaugh – vocals, lead guitar
Bob Casale – rhythm guitar/lead guitar, keyboards, vocals
Alan Myers – drums

Technical
Grata Video – producer
Mike Varga – editor
Geoff Falasca – editor
James W. Kelley – animator
John Joh – graphic design
Joe Reis – executive producer
Fred Seaman – executive producer
Jackie Sharp – co-producer
Gerald V. Casale – liner notes
Greg Prato – liner notes
Bob Casale – CD mastering

References

External links
MVD's page on Devo Live 1980
Club Devo – Official website
 Devo Live Guide – Comprehensive guide to Devo's live performances.
Devo Live 1980 Review

Devo live albums
Devo video albums
2005 live albums
2005 video albums
Live video albums